The following is a list of notable Lebanon architects in alphabetical order.

A

Michel Abboud (born 1977)
Youssef Aftimus (1866-1952)
Mardiros Altounian (1888-1958)
Amale Andraos (born 1973)
B
Mikaella Boulos (born 1992)
E
Ammar Eloueini (born 1968)
F
Pierre Fakhoury (born 1943)
G
Nabil Gholam (born 1962)
K
Salim Al-Kadi
Joseph Philippe Karam (1923-1976)
Nadim Karam (born 1957)
Maroun Kassab (born 1973)
Bernard Khoury (born 1969)
Pierre el-Khoury (1930-2005)
M
Mariagroup
Chadi Massaad (born 1959)
R
Raëd Abillama Architects
S
Hashim Sarkis (born 1964)

See also

 Architecture of Lebanon
 List of architects
 List of Lebanese people
 Lebanon

Lebanese